Olloudius is a widely venerated  Celtic god, known from locations as far apart as Custom Shrubs in Gloucestershire and Ollioules in southern Gaul. The only existing image was found at the Cotswold site. The male figure is rendered in native style, with a small head and a large, elongated body, carrying a patera or offering plate and a double cornucopia and is dedicated to " Mars Olloudius". The god carries no military attributes, however, and he wears a cap and cloak rather than armour. Hence, Mars Olloudius belongs to important group of Celtic deities who adopted the name of Mars but were peaceful protectors, healers, and fertility spirits. The double horn of plenty stresses the prosperity function of the god among the Dobunni of Gloucestershire. Another image was found at the same site, quite clearly the work of the same craftsman: on this second depiction Mars is represented with shield, spear, and sword, but again the cornucopia is present, this time indicating the hybrid nature of the god: in this peaceful region, the warrior is not combative in the true sense of the word, but instead plays the role of guardian against disease, barrenness, and other evils.

References 

Dictionary of Celtic Myth and Legend. Miranda Green. Thames and Hudson Ltd. London. 1997

Gaulish gods
Gods of the ancient Britons